Ronald Reagan Federal Building and Courthouse refers to several structures located in the United States.

Ronald Reagan Federal Building and Courthouse (Santa Ana)
Ronald Reagan Federal Building and Courthouse (Pennsylvania)